Second Dynasty most often refers to Second Dynasty of Egypt.

Second Dynasty may also refer to:

 Second Babylonian dynasty
 Second Dynasty of Isin, Babylon
 Second Shō Dynasty, Ryukyu Islands, Japan
 Second Dynasty of Ur
 Second Zhou Dynasty, China
 Second dynasty XI-XII centuries, Serbia

See also
 Timeline of Portuguese history (Second Dynasty)